Anastasiya Sergeyevna Polyanskaya, née Yatsenko (her first name is also transliterated as Anastasia by the ITU; born 5 February 1986 in Zhovti Vody) is a professional Ukrainian and Russian triathlete, Russian Supersprint Champion of the year 2009 and 2010, and permanent member of the Russian National Team.

Anastasiya Polyanskaya was born and raised in Ukraine and competed for Ukraine up to 2007. On 27 May 2007 Polyanskaya's first daughter Elizaveta was born and on 14 December 2007 she married the Russian triathlete Dmitry Polyanski with whom she lives in Penza, where the Russian triathlon championships are held.

ITU Competitions 
In the nine years from 2002 to 2010, Anastasiya Polyanskaya took part in 48 ITU competitions and achieved 16 top ten positions, among which the two gold medals at Palembang (2009). In 2008, Polyanskaya took off a year because of the birth of her daughter.
In March 2011, Polyanskaya opened the new season with two medals: silver at the Pan American Cup in Santiago, gold at the Premium Pan American Cup in Valparaíso.
The following list is based upon the official ITU rankings and the athlete's Profile Page. Unless indicated otherwise, all the following events are triathlons (Olympic Distance) and refer to the Elite category.

DNF = did not finish · DNS = did not start

External links 
 Russian Triathlon Federation

Notes 

1986 births
Living people
Russian female triathletes
Ukrainian female triathletes